Cladostephaceae is a family of brown algae belonging to the order Sphacelariales in the class Phaeophyceae.

The family comprises a single genus:
 Cladostephus C.Agardh, 1817

References

Brown algae
Brown algae families